Nikolai Afanasyevich Safronidi (born 10 September 1983) is a Russian professional football coach and a former player. He is the assistant coach of FC Ufa. He played as a left midfielder.

Personal life
He is of Caucasus Greek and Armenian descent.

Career statistics

Club

Notes

External links
 

Living people
1983 births
Sportspeople from Vladikavkaz
Russian footballers
Association football midfielders
FC Ural Yekaterinburg players
FC SKA-Khabarovsk players
Russian Premier League players
FC Ufa players
Russian people of Greek descent
FC Spartak Vladikavkaz players
Russian football managers
FC Ufa managers
Russian Premier League managers
FC Mashuk-KMV Pyatigorsk players